Rudnichny (masculine), Rudnichnaya (feminine), or Rudnichnoye (neuter) may refer to:
Rudnichny City District, name of several city districts in Russia
Rudnichny, Russia (Rudnichnaya, Rudnichnoye), name of several inhabited localities in Russia
Rudnichny, Kazakhstan
Rudnichnoye, a lake in Kazakhstan